Pontophaedusella is a monotypic genus of air-breathing land snails, terrestrial pulmonate gastropod mollusks in the family Clausiliidae, the door snails, all of which have a clausilium.

Species
The sole species belonging to this genus is Pontophaedusella offenses Nordsieck 1994. This species is known only from the type locality ("Prov. Trabzon, FF 03, 2 km SW Of"). The anatomy of Pontophaedusella ofensis was described by Szekeres (1998).

References

Clausiliidae
Endemic fauna of Turkey